In astrogeology, chaos terrain, or chaotic terrain, is a planetary surface area where features such as ridges, cracks, and plains appear jumbled and enmeshed with one another. Chaos terrain is a notable feature of the planets Mars and Mercury, Jupiter's moon Europa, and the dwarf planet Pluto. In scientific nomenclature, "chaos" is used as a component of proper nouns (e.g., "Aureum Chaos" on Mars).

On Mars 

On April 1, 2010, NASA released the first images under the HiWish program in which citizens suggested places for HiRISE to photograph.  One of the eight locations was Aureum Chaos.  The first image below gives a wide view of the area.  The next two images are from the HiRISE image.

On Mercury

Causes

The specific causes of chaos terrain are not yet well understood. A number of different astrogeological forces have been offered as causes of chaos terrain. On Europa, impact events and subsequent penetration into a ductile or liquid crust were suggested in 2004. In November 2011, a team of researchers from the University of Texas at Austin and elsewhere presented evidence in the journal Nature suggesting that many "chaos terrain" features on Europa sit atop vast lakes of liquid water. These lakes would be entirely encased in the moon's icy outer shell and distinct from a liquid ocean thought to exist farther down beneath the ice shell. Rather than an external impact, the authors propose a four-step model for producing the surface expressions (chaos terrain) and the shallow, covered lakes. Full confirmation of the lakes' existence will require a space mission designed to probe the ice shell either physically or indirectly, for example using radar.

On Mars, chaos terrain is believed to be associated with the release of huge amounts of water.  The Chaotic features may have collapsed when water came out of the surface.  Martian rivers begin with a Chaos region. A chaotic region can be recognized by a rat's nest of mesas, buttes, and hills, chopped through with valleys which in places look almost patterned. Some parts of this chaotic area have not collapsed completely—they are still formed into large mesas, so they may still contain water ice.  Chaotic terrain occurs in numerous locations on Mars, and always gives the strong impression that something abruptly disturbed the ground.  Chaos regions formed long ago. By counting craters (more craters in any given area means an older surface) and by studying the valleys' relations with other geological features, scientists have concluded the channels formed 2.0 to 3.8 billion years ago.

Scientists have thought of different ideas for the cause of chaotic terrain.  One explanation for the source of the water that quickly left the ground and created chaos is that water rich sediment was deposited in giant canyons on the floor of an ocean.  Later, when the ocean disappeared, the sediments froze.  If hot magma came near to the region, the ice would have melted and formed large underground river systems.  When these neared the surface, huge amounts would break out of the ground and carve the valleys we see today.  There is much evidence for an ocean on Mars.
Places have been photographed that could be where the ground collapsed when water left an subterranean rivers to flow out of chaotic regions.  One of the first theories for the source of the water was based on old Viking Orbiter pictures.  It was thought that these outflows came from a global cryosphere-confined aquifer that collected water from south polar meltwater.  The cryosphere would have formed during the Hesperian period in the planet's history.  into the planet’s upper crust.  One chaotic terrain, Galaxias Chaos may be caused by sublimation of an ice-rich deposit.

In popular culture
 In the graphic novel Watchmen, Dr. Manhattan ponders upon the alternative viewpoints of existence, and says that Mars did not choose life, but rather "chaotic terrain".
 In the science fiction novel Armada (novel), Chaos Terrain is a business that makes videogames secretly designed to teach civilians how to fight Europan aliens.

See also

References

External links 

Planetary geology